Khazana may refer to:

 Khazana (union council)
 Khazana (1951 film), an Indian Hindi-language adventure film
 Khazana (1987 film), an action adventure film
 Khazana (2014 film), a drama thriller film